The FIBA U16 Women's African Championship is an under-16 basketball championship in the International Basketball Federation's FIBA Africa zone. The tournament is held biennially. The top two teams qualify directly to the FIBA Under-17 Women's World Cup.

Summary

Medal table

MVP Awards

Participation details

Under-17 Women's World Cup record

 Nigeria failed to participate in the event

See also
 FIBA Women's African Championship
 FIBA U18 Women's African Championship
 FIBA Africa Under-20 Championship for Women

References

External links
 2011 U-16 Championship - africabasket.com
 - FIBA Archives

 
Africa
Women's basketball competitions in Africa between national teams